Anna Rita Sparaciari (born 3 March 1959) is an Italian fencer. She competed in the women's individual and team foil events at the 1980 Summer Olympics.

References

1959 births
Sportspeople from Ancona
Living people
Italian female fencers
Olympic fencers of Italy
Fencers at the 1980 Summer Olympics